Arrah Lok Sabha constituency is one of the 40 Lok Sabha (parliamentary) constituencies in the Bihar state of India. It is a part of the Bhojpur district and comprises of 7 Assembly constituencies consisting of Sandesh, Barhara, Arrah, Agiaon (SC), Tarari, Jagdishpur and Shahpur.

Assembly segments

1951-1961
From 1951 to 1961, the Patna-cum-Shahabad Lok Sabha constituency (renamed as Shahabad in 1957) comprised the following areas: Bikram, Bihta and Paliganj police stations of Danapur sub-division in Patna District; Barhara, Arrah Muffasil, Sahar, Sandesh, Arrah Town and Arrah Nawada police stations of Shahabad Sadar (Arrah) sub-division of Shahabad district.

1961-1976
From 1961 to 1976, the Shahabad Lok Sabha constituency (renamed as Arrah in 1976) had 6 Bihar Legislative Assembly seats. Bikram and Paliganj from Patna district and Sandesh, Arrah, Arrah Muffasil and Sahar from Bhojpur district.

1976-2008
From 1976 to 2008, the Arrah Lok Sabha constituency had 6 Bihar Legislative Assembly seats. Maner and Paliganj from Patna district and Sandesh, Barhara, Arrah and Sahar from Bhojpur district.

2008-Present

Arrah Lok Sabha constituency comprises the following seven Bihar Legislative Assembly seats, all from Bhojpur district.

Members of Parliament

1952-1957
As Patna-cum-Shahabad Lok Sabha constituency. This constituency was in existence in only the 1st Lok Sabha from 1952 to 1957.

1957-1977

As Shahabad Lok Sabha constituency. It was in existence from 2nd to 5th Lok Sabha

1977-Present 
As present day Arrah Lok Sabha constituency. It is in existence since the 6th Lok Sabha. The erstwhile Shahabad district was bifurcated into Bhojpur district (Arrah) and Rohtas district (Sasaram) in year 1972.

Election Results

General Elections 2019

General Elections 2014

See also
 Bhojpur district
 List of Constituencies of the Lok Sabha
 Arrah Junction Railway station

References

External links
Arrah lok sabha  constituency election 2019 result details

Lok Sabha constituencies in Bihar
Politics of Bhojpur district, India